The Correspondence with James the Pretender (High Treason) Act 1701 (13 & 14 Will. III, c. 3) was an Act of Parliament of the Parliament of England passed in 1701. The Act—the long title of which was "An Act for the Attainder of the pretended Prince of Wales of High Treason"— was a response to the Jacobite claim to the English and Scottish thrones of James Francis Edward Stuart (the Old Pretender), who declared himself King James III of England and Ireland and VIII of Scotland upon the death of his father, the exiled James II of England, in September 1701.

The Act expressed the "utmost Resentment of so great an Indignity" and "manifest violation" to William III of England, declared that the "pretended Prince of Wales" was convicted and attainted of high treason and that he was "to suffer Pains of Death and incurr all Forfeitures as a Traitor"; and provided that if any English subject was to knowingly hold any correspondence with James Stuart, or with any person in his employ, or to knowingly spend or transmit any sum of money for the use of James, then on conviction they would be deemed guilty of high treason. If these offences were committed outside the realm, then they could be brought to trial in any English county.

This Act was repealed by the Statute Law Revision Act 1948.

See also
 Correspondence with Enemies Act 1691
 Correspondence with the Pretender Act 1697
 Security of the Succession, etc. Act 1701
 Treason Act
 Treason Act 1743

Explanatory notes

References 

 

1701 in law
1701 in England
Acts of the Parliament of England
James Francis Edward Stuart
Treason in England